William Tillman Warren (1877 - 1962) was an architect in Birmingham, Alabama.

Warren was born in Montgomery, Alabama. In 1897 Warren received an engineering degree from Alabama Polytechnic Institute, the forerunner to Auburn University. He received a degree in architecture from Columbia University in 1902. He worked in New York with the firm of McKim, Meade & White until 1906 before relocating back home to Alabama and establishing a practice in Birmingham in 1907.

He was in several partnerships. Warren, Eugene H. Knight, and John E. Davis formed the partnership of Warren, Knight & Davis in Birmingham in 1921. 

He and his firms made significant contributions to the architectural history of Birmingham. He was married to Dorothea Orr Warren and they had two children, Dorothea (Dorothy) and William, Jr. (Bill). The Birmingham Public Library has a collection of his papers. In 2017 he was inducted into the Birmingham Business Hall of Fame.

Works
Wesleyan Hall annex 1909 at the University of North Alabama in Florence, Alabama

Further reading
Remembered Past Discovered Future - The Alabama Architecture of Warren Knight & Davis, 1906-1961 by John M. schnorrenberg

References

1877 births
1962 deaths
Architects from Alabama